This is a list of Swiss football transfers for the 2017 summer transfer window. Only transfers featuring Swiss Super League are listed.

Swiss Super League

Basel

In:

Out:

Grasshopper Club Zürich

In:

Out:

Lausanne

In:

Out:

Lugano

In:

Out:

Luzern

In:

Out:

Sion

In:

Out:

St. Gallen

In:

Out:

Thun

In:

Out:

Young Boys

In:

Out:

Zürich

In:

Out:

References

Transfers
Switzerland
2017